Volodymyr Vasylyovych Bezsonov (also spelled Vladimir Vasilijević Bessonov, born 5 March 1958) is a Ukrainian football manager and former player, he played for the Soviet Union national football team. The most recent team he was managing was Dnipro Dnipropetrovsk in the Ukrainian Premier League.

Club career
Bezsonov's career began in 1976 with Dynamo Kyiv. Here he spent most of his career, except for a short one-season stint in Israeli club Maccabi Haifa F.C. in 1990–91. He was well known as a lightning quick full-back with a powerful shot. Bezsonov was attack-minded and scored a good return for a defender. He ended 27 goals in the 377 games that played for Dynamo.

International career
Bezsonov won 79 caps and scored 4 goals for the Soviet Union national football team from 1977 to 1990 and was included in three FIFA World Cup squads. He also holds the record for the fifth highest appearances for the Soviet Union national football team. In the 1990 World Cup he was sent off against Argentina. His team ended up losing the game 2–0 which became eventually his farewell match for the Sbornaya.

In 1979 Bezsonov played couple of games for Ukraine at the Spartakiad of the Peoples of the USSR.

Managerial career
Most recently, Bezsonov was the head coach of Dnipro Dnipropetrovsk in the Ukrainian Premier League, but was sacked in Sep. 2010 following elimination from the UEFA Europa League and a number of poor results domestically.

Personal life 
Bezsonov is married to Viktoria Serkyh, a former two-time world champion in rhythmic gymnastics. Together they have a daughter, Anna Bessonova, who also competed internationally in rhythmic gymnastics, became world champion in 2007, and an Olympic bronze medalist in 2004 and 2008.

In February 2022, a photo of Bezsonov holding a gun and defending his home during the Russian invasion of Ukraine was posted on social media by his daughter.

Career statistics

Club

The statistics in USSR Cups and Europe is made under the scheme "autumn-spring" and enlisted in a year of start of tournaments

International

Score and results list Soviet Union's goal tally first.

Honours

Club
Dynamo Kyiv
 Soviet Top League: 1977, 1980, 1981, 1985, 1986, 1990
 Soviet Cup: 1978, 1982, 1984–85, 1986–87, 1989–90
 Soviet Super Cup: 1980, 1985, 1986; runner-up: 1977
 UEFA Cup Winners' Cup: 1986
 UEFA Super Cup runner-up: 1986

International
Soviet Union
 Summer Olympics bronze: 1980
 UEFA Euro runner-up: 1988

Individual
 FIFA World Youth Championship Golden Ball: 1977
 Ukrainian Footballer of the Year: 1989; second place: 1988; third place: 1986
 Voted in the Soviet Unions "All time World Cup team" on planetworldcup.com above other great Full-backs such as Igor Netto and Vasiliy Rats.

References

External links 
 Info on Dnipro official website
 
 
 

1958 births
Living people
Footballers from Kharkiv
Soviet footballers
Soviet expatriate footballers
Ukrainian footballers
Ukrainian football managers
FC Dynamo Kyiv players
Maccabi Haifa F.C. players
Expatriate footballers in Israel
Soviet expatriate sportspeople in Israel
Footballers at the 1980 Summer Olympics
Olympic bronze medalists for the Soviet Union
Olympic footballers of the Soviet Union
1982 FIFA World Cup players
1986 FIFA World Cup players
UEFA Euro 1988 players
1990 FIFA World Cup players
Soviet Union international footballers
Soviet Top League players
Ukrainian Premier League managers
FC Arsenal Kyiv managers
Ukrainian expatriate sportspeople in Turkmenistan
Expatriate football managers in Turkmenistan
Turkmenistan national football team managers
FC Nyva Vinnytsia managers
FC Zorya Luhansk managers
FC Kharkiv managers
FC Dnipro managers
Ukraine student football team managers
Olympic medalists in football
Honoured Masters of Sport of the USSR
Medalists at the 1988 Summer Olympics
Medalists at the 1980 Summer Olympics
Olympic gold medalists for the Soviet Union
Association football fullbacks
Ukrainian expatriate football managers
Recipients of the Order of Merit (Ukraine), 2nd class
Ukrainian military personnel of the 2022 Russian invasion of Ukraine